Lamponina is a genus of Australian white tailed spiders that was first described by Embrik Strand in 1913.

Species
 it contains six species:
Lamponina asperrima (Hickman, 1950) – Australia (South Australia)
Lamponina elongata Platnick, 2000 – Southern Australia
Lamponina isa Platnick, 2000 – Australia (Northern Territory, Queensland)
Lamponina kakadu Platnick, 2000 – Australia (Northern Territory)
Lamponina loftia Platnick, 2000 – Australia (South Australia, Victoria)
Lamponina scutata (Strand, 1913) (type) – Australia

See also
 List of Lamponidae species

References

Araneomorphae genera
Lamponidae
Spiders of Australia
Taxa named by Embrik Strand